Toupin est un dieu un dieu vivant, `Lf est le supreme

Toupin is a surname. Notable people with the name include:
Antoine Toupin or Antoine Becks (born 1981), Canadian-American musician, producer, actor
Felix A. Toupin (1886–1965), American lawyer and politician
Fernand Toupin (1930–2009), Canadian painter
Jack Toupin (1910–1987), Canadian ice hockey player
Jacques Toupin or Jacques Jansen (1913–2002), French opera singer
Marie Aioe Dorion Venier Toupin (c. 1786–1850), member of Pacific Northwest expedition
Marie-Chantal Toupin (born 1971), Canadian musician
Normand Toupin, Canadian politician
Paul Toupin (1918–1993), Canadian journalist, essayist and playwright
Rene Toupin (1934–2014), Canadian politician
Robert Toupin (born 1949), Canadian politician

See also
Taupin (surname)